Sean Penkywicz (born 18 May 1982) is a former Wales international rugby league footballer who last played as a  for the Rochdale Hornets in RFL League 1.

Playing career
Sean Penkywicz was born in Leigh, Greater Manchester, England.

Halifax RLFC
Beginning his career with Halifax, Penkywicz made his Super League début in 2000.

Huddersfield Giants
He left Halifax and joined the Huddersfield Giants in 2004 following Halifax's relegation from the Super League. In 2005, Penkywicz was banned for two years after testing positive for steroid use.

Halifax RLFC (rejoined)
In 2007 he rejoined Halifax in the Championship, where he went on to help the West Yorkshire outfit to a period of sustained success that included 2 Grand Final appearances in a row (2009 & 2010) and 2 Northern Rail Cup Final appearances in a row (2011 & 2012). Fax would win the Grand Final in 2010 beating Featherstone Rovers 23-22 before Penkywicz captained the blue and whites to Northern Rail Cup glory in 2012, again beating the lowly Rovers in a grandstand finale.

Leigh Centurions
After 5 seasons with Halifax, Penkywicz joined the Leigh Centurions in 2013. His contract was terminated in 2015 after failing a drugs test.

Toronto Wolfpack
Penkywicz joined the Toronto Wolfpack on a short-term contract, making 13 appearances for the club during their inaugural 2017 season in League 1, and helping the team to promotion, after which he joined Workington Town.

Rochdale Hornets
Penkywicz joined the Rochdale Hornets for the 2020 season and was appointed captain by coach Matt Calland.

International
In 2008, he was named in the Wales squad to face England at the Keepmoat Stadium prior to England's departure for the 2008 Rugby League World Cup.

References

External links
 (archived by web.archive.org) Workington Town profile
 (archived by web.archive.org) Halifax profile

1982 births
Living people
English people of Polish descent
English people of Welsh descent
English rugby league players
Halifax R.L.F.C. players
Huddersfield Giants players
Leigh Leopards players
Rochdale Hornets captains
Rochdale Hornets players
Rugby league five-eighths
Rugby league halfbacks
Rugby league hookers
Rugby league players from Leigh, Greater Manchester
Toronto Wolfpack players
Wales national rugby league team players
Workington Town players